Penteli is a village and a municipality in the North Athens regional unit, Attica, Greece. It belongs to the Athens rural area. It takes its name from Mount Pentelicus.

Municipality
The municipality Penteli was formed at the 2011 local government reform by the merger of the following 3 former municipalities, that became municipal units:
Melissia
Nea Penteli
Penteli

Geography
Penteli is situated on the southern slopes of the limestone Penteli mountains. The municipality has an area of 36.064 km2, the municipal unit Penteli 28.878 km2. It is 14 km northeast of central Athens. Some of the neighbourhoods of Penteli are Agia Triada, Agios Dimitrios, Daou and Kallithea.

History
The bones of prehistoric animals - mastodons, rhinoceros, antelope, and giraffe, along with giant turtles, hyenas and other animals no longer extant in the area - have been found among the limestone crags of the mountain that looms over the present suburb of Athens. The Penteli mountains were renowned in Classical Greece as well as in the Roman Empire as a source of the marble, which was also used to build the Parthenon. The Romans constructed a 140-foot water tower and aqueduct to supply water to the city of Athens. Penteli is the site of the ancient town of Pentele.

During the Greek War of Independence, the French philhellene Sophie de Marbois-Lebrun, Duchess of Plaisance supported the revolutionary leaders. When she settled in Greece in 1834, she bought large plots of land in Athens and on the Penteli mountain. She had the Rododafni Castle built for her.

In July 1995, Penteli was ravaged by a large forest fire. According to Turkish former prime minister, Mesut Yilmaz, many of the forest fires that raged the Greek countryside during that summer were actually started by Turkish secret service agents. The forests of Penteli suffered damage again from the August 2007 fires.

Transport
The area is serviced by Pentelis railway station on the Athens Airport–Patras line.

Historical population

Sights

 Monastery of Penteli
Rododafni Castle, also known as Pyrgos Doukissis Plakentias, a mansion built for the Duchess of Plaisance. Construction was started in 1840, but it was not finished until 1961, when Constantine II of Greece moved into it.
The Penteli Astronomical Station of the National Observatory of Athens, completed in 1936

Byzantine monuments 
The catholicon of the old Monastery of St.Nicholas (Kallesia-Penteli). A wall painting monument of George Markou the Argus, the great and prolific post-Byzantine ecclesiastic iconographer of the 18th century.

Gallery

See also
List of settlements in Attica

References

External links

Official website 

Municipalities of Attica
Populated places in North Athens (regional unit)